Mandimba is the principal town of Mandimba District in Niassa Province in north-western Mozambique.

Further reading

District profile

Populated places in Niassa Province
Mandimba District